Ecrobia is a genus of very small aquatic snails, operculate gastropod mollusks in the family Hydrobiidae.

Species
Species within the genus Ecrobia include:
 Ecrobia grimmi (Clessin & Dybowski, 1888)
 Ecrobia maritima (Milaschewitsch, 1916)
 Ecrobia truncata (Vanatta, 1924)
 Ecrobia ventrosa (Montagu, 1803)
Species brought into synonymy
 Ecrobia pontieuxini (Radoman, 1973): synonym of Ecrobia maritima (Milaschewitsch, 1916)

Taxonomy
Davis et al. (1989: 341-342, 347) suggested that the North American Hydrobia truncata (Vanatta, 1924), the type species of Ecrobia, was introduced from Europe and would then possibly be a synonym of Hydrobia ventrosa which is representative of Ventrosia Radoman, 1977. Even if the species are considered as separate, they are to be considered congeneric and therefore the older name Ecrobia must be given preference over Ventrosia. Haase et al. (2010) use Ecrobia as valid genus.

References

 de Kluijver, M.J.; Ingalsuo, S.S.; de Bruyne, R.H. (2000). Macrobenthos of the North Sea [CD-ROM]: 1. Keys to Mollusca and Brachiopoda. World Biodiversity Database CD-ROM Series. Expert Center for Taxonomic Identification (ETI): Amsterdam, The Netherlands. . 1 cd-rom pp
 Rolán E., 2005. Malacological Fauna From The Cape Verde Archipelago. Part 1, Polyplacophora and Gastropoda.

External links
  Oliverio, Marco (2006). Gastropoda Prosobranchia Caenogastropoda, in: Revisione della Checklist della fauna marina Italiana

 
Hydrobiidae